The Eyalet of Kefe or Caffa was an eyalet of the Ottoman Empire. The eyalet stretched across the northern coast of the Black Sea with the main sanjak (Pasha sanjak) being located in the southern coast of Crimea. The eyalet was under direct Ottoman rule, completely separate from the Khanate of Crimea. Its capital was at Kefe, the Turkish name for Caffa (modern Feodosiya in Crimea).

History

The city of Caffa and its surroundings were first made an Ottoman dominion after the Turks overran the Genoese in 1475, after which a sanjak centred on Caffa was created. The Eyalet of Kefe was formed in 1568 as a beylerbeylik. By the 17th-century accounts of Evliya Çelebi, its sanjaks were "ruled by Voivodas immediately appointed by the Ottoman Sultan and not by the Khans". The eyalet was annexed to a briefly independent Khanate of Crimea as a result of the Treaty of Küçük Kaynarca of 1774. The Khanate itself would be annexed by the Russian Empire in 1783.

Administrative divisions
The administrative divisions of the beylerbeylik of Kefe between 1700-1730 were as follows:
 Sanjak of Pasha (Paşa Sancağı, Feodosiya)
 Sanjak of Akkerman (Akkerman Sancağı, Bilhorod-Dnistrovskyi)
 Sanjak of Bender (Bender Sancağı, Bender)
 Sanjak of Atshu Castle (Kal'a-i Açu Sancağı, Temryuk?)
 Sanjak of Zane (Zane Sancağı)
 Sanjak of Kinburn (Kılburun Sancağı, Kinburn)

Kefe Sanjak
Initial subdivisions
 Kaza of Mengub (Mangup)
 Kaza of Suğdak (Sudak)
 Kaza of Kerç (Kerch)
 Kaza of Azak (Azov)
 Kaza of Taman (Taman)

 Special status cities: Balıklagu (Balaklava) and İnkerman (Inkerman)

See also
 History of Crimea

References

Bibliography
 
 

Eyalets of the Ottoman Empire in Europe
1568 establishments in the Ottoman Empire
1774 disestablishments in the Ottoman Empire